Two hundred and forty-eight Guggenheim Fellowships were awarded in 1955, with grants totaling at $968,000.

1955 U.S. and Canadian Fellows

1955 Latin American and Caribbean Fellows

See also
 Guggenheim Fellowship
 List of Guggenheim Fellowships awarded in 1954
 List of Guggenheim Fellowships awarded in 1956

References

1955
1955 awards